Nicholas Delbanco (born 1942) is an American writer.

Life and career
Delbanco was born in London, England, the son of German Jewish parents Barbara (née Bernstein) and Kurt Delbanco, a businessman, art dealer, and sculptor. He was educated at Harvard University, graduating with a B.A. in 1963; and at Columbia University, with an M.A. in 1966. He taught at Bennington College, Bennington, Vermont, 1966–1984, and at Skidmore College, Saratoga Springs, New York, 1984–85. He was a visiting professor at such institutions also as Trinity College, Williams College, Columbia University and the University of Iowa. He was director of the MFA Program, and the Hopwood Awards Program at the University of Michigan, until his retirement in 2015.

He has published 30 books of fiction and nonfiction. His most recent novel is The Years (2013), and his most recent work of nonfiction is  Curiouser and Curiouser: Essays (2017). In 2015, he published The Art of Youth: Crane, Carrington, Gershwin, and the Nature of First Acts. In 2016, he published the Omnibus collection, Dear Wizard: The Letters of Nicholas Delbanco and Jon Manchip White. In 2011, he republished Sherbrookes. This book brings his trilogy of novels (Possession, Sherbrookes, and Stillness from  1977, 1978, and 1980, respectively) between the covers of a single book. Shebrookes is not simply a reissue of the three original novels together, but a revised edition of the trilogy without being a complete revision of the original story.

Delbanco has served as chair of the Fiction Panel for the National Book Awards, and as a judge for, among other contests, the PEN/Faulkner Award in Fiction and the Pulitzer Prize.  He received a Guggenheim Fellowship in 1980, and twice, a National Endowment for the Arts writing fellowship.

Personal life

Delbanco is the brother of Thomas L. Delbanco, a physician and Harvard professor, and social critic and historian Andrew Delbanco. He is married to Elena Greenhouse, daughter of Beaux Arts Trio cellist Bernard Greenhouse. They have two daughters, novelist and screenwriter Francesca Delbanco, and TIME editor Andrea Delbanco.
  
In 1962, while Delbanco was a student at Harvard, he was in a creative writing course at Harvard Summer School taught by John Updike, author and Harvard alumnus. Another student in this class was Jonathan Penner. 

In the 1960s, Delbanco might have had a relationship with Carly Simon, which might be alluded to in her song "You're So Vain", but Simon refuses to confirm.

Works

Short stories
 The collection, About My Table, and Other Stories, publisher—William Morrow & Co, 1983
 The collection, The Writer's Trade, and Other Stories, publisher—William Morrow & Co.

Novels
 
 Grasse, 3/23/66. Lippincott. 1968.
 Consider Sappho Burning.  Morrow, 1969.
 
 
 The Sherbrooke Trilogy (1977–1980)
 
 
 
 
 
 
Sherbrookes: Possession / Sherbrookes / Stillness. Champagne, Ill: Dalkey Archive Press, 2011.  (paper)  (e-book)
"The Years", Little A books, 2017

Nonfiction
 
 
 
 
 
 
 
 
title: "Curiouser and Curiouser" Ohio State University Press, 2017

Editor

 The Sincerest Form, Writing Fiction by Imitation, publisher-McGraw-Hill, 2004
 Craft & Voice, an Introduction to Literature (w. Alan Cheuse), publisher—McGraw-Hill, 2012

References

External links
Author's Official Website
University of Michigan faculty
New York State Writers Institute
American Legacy, Nicholas Delbanco, Boston Review, October/November 2004
Nicholas Delbanco on Writers at Bennington, August 14 2007
Nicholas Delbanco, Harper's Magazine

1942 births
American people of German-Jewish descent
Jewish American writers
Columbia University alumni
Harvard University alumni
Iowa Writers' Workshop faculty
Living people
University of Michigan faculty
21st-century American Jews